Phonepaseuth Sysoutham  is a Laotian footballer who plays as a midfielder.

References 

Living people
1990 births
Laotian footballers
Laos international footballers
Association football midfielders